Arnold van Ravesteyn (1605 in The Hague – 1690 in The Hague), was a Dutch Golden Age portrait painter.

Biography
According to the RKD he was a pupil of his father, the painter Anthonie van Ravesteyn, who became a member of the Haarlem Guild of St. Luke in 1639 and who became a member and founder of the Confrerie Pictura in 1656.
He was the teacher of the painters Samuel Cabeljauw, Johannes Dabbe, Daniël Haringh, Job Houttuyn, Otto Hoynck, Willem Frederiksz van Royen, and Willem Wissing.

References

External links
Arnold van Ravesteyn on Artnet

1605 births
1690 deaths
Dutch Golden Age painters
Dutch male painters
Artists from The Hague
Painters from The Hague
Painters from Haarlem